Peel Sessions are live music sessions recorded for John Peel's BBC Radio 1 show.

Peel Sessions may also refer to:

A–F
 Peel Session (Autechre EP)
 Peel Session 2, by Autechre
 The Peel Sessions (Babes in Toyland album)
 The Peel Sessions (Band of Susans album)
 The Peel Session (Syd Barrett album)
 Peel Session TX 21/07/1998, by Boards of Canada
 The Peel Session (Bolt Thrower EP)
 The Peel Sessions 1988–90, by Bolt Thrower
The Peel Session (Bongwater EP)
 The Peel Sessions (Bonzo Dog Band album)
 The Peel Sessions Album (Billy Bragg album)
 The Peel Session (Bratmobile EP)
 Peel Sessions (Tim Buckley album)
 Peel Session TX 09/03/00, by Mira Calix
 The Peel Sessions (Can album)
 The Peel Sessions, by Carcass
 The Peel Session by Clouddead
 The Peel Sessions (The Cure EP)
 The Complete BBC Peel Sessions, by the Delgados
 The Peel Sessions (Echo & the Bunnymen EP)
 The Fall: The Complete Peel Sessions 1978–2004
 Peel Sessions, by Family
 The Peel Sessions (Fluke album)

G–N
 Peel Sessions (Galaxie 500 album)
 The Peel Sessions (Gang of Four album)
 The Peel Sessions, by Peter Hammill
 The Peel Sessions 1989 and The Peel Sessions 1991, by the Happy Mondays
 The Peel Sessions 1991–2004, by PJ Harvey
 Peel Sessions (Hot Snakes EP)
 BBC Radio 1 John Peel Sessions (I Am Kloot album)
 The Peel Sessions (The Jesus and Mary Chain EP)
 The Complete John Peel Sessions (The Jesus and Mary Chain album)
 The Peel Sessions (Joy Division), two EPs and a compilation album
 The Peel Sessions 1979–1981, by Killing Joke
 The Peel Sessions (Madness)
 John Peel Sessions (The Moondogs album)
 The Peel Session (Múm EP)
 The Peel Sessions (Napalm Death album)
 The Peel Sessions (New Order album)
 The Complete John Peel Sessions (Gary Numan album)

O–Z
 The Peel Sessions Album, by the Only Ones
 Peel Session (Orbital EP)
 Peel Sessions 1979–1983, by Orchestral Manoeuvres in the Dark
 The Peel Sessions (Prong EP)
 The Peel Sessions (Pulp album)
 The Peel Sessions (The Ruts album)
 The Peel Sessions (Siouxsie and the Banshees)
 The Peel Sessions, by the Slits
 Peel Sessions (The Smashing Pumpkins EP)
 The Peel Sessions (The Smiths EP)
 The Peel Sessions, by June Tabor
 The Peel Sessions (That Petrol Emotion EP)
 The Peel Sessions (Thin Lizzy album)
 Peel Sessions (The Triffids album)
 The Peel Sessions (Trumans Water album)
 The Peel Sessions Album, by the Undertones
 The Complete Peel Sessions 1986–2004, by the Wedding Present
 Ukrainian John Peel Sessions, by the Wedding Present
 The Peel Sessions Album (Wire album)

Various
 Too Pure – The Peel Sessions, by Th'Faith Healers, Stereolab, and PJ Harvey

See also
:Category:Peel Sessions recordings
List of Peel sessions
List of Peel Sessions issued by Strange Fruit Records